Petr Voříšek (born 19 March 1979, Děčín, Czechoslovakia) is a Czech footballer who currently plays for FK Junior Děčín as a defender or midfielder.

He has played for the Czech Republic national football team (4 times) and Rapid Vienna, SV Pasching, FK Mladá Boleslav, FK Teplice, FK Chomutov, Sparta Prague and SC Rheindorf Altach. Voříšek was also part of the Czech side which won the UEFA U-21 Championships in 2002.

Career

Later career
After a year at SC Altach, Vorisek moved to the Regionalliga Mitte for SV Wallern. He spent four years there, with the best performance in 2013/2014 with a fourth place in the table. He was also appointed player-manager for the 2015–16 season.

For the 2016/2017 season he moved to the Upper Austrian League club SV Gmunden. In April 2018, he was appointed interim manager for Gmunden. The club announced in July 2018, that he would continue in his position as a player-manager. However, he was replaced as manager at the end of 2018 but continued to play for the team

He played for Gmunden until the summer 2019, before joining Union Michaelnbach. However, the club reported in the winter 2020, that he had returned to the Czech Republic. Voříšek returned to his hometown, Děčín, where he joined FK Junior Děčín.

References

External links
 
 

 

1979 births
Living people
People from Děčín
Czech footballers
Czech football managers
Czech Republic youth international footballers
Czech Republic under-21 international footballers
Czech Republic international footballers
AC Sparta Prague players
SK Rapid Wien players
FK Mladá Boleslav players
FK Teplice players
SC Rheindorf Altach players
SV Wallern players
SV Gmunden players
Austrian Football Bundesliga players
Expatriate footballers in Austria
Association football midfielders
Sportspeople from the Ústí nad Labem Region